Progress charts are tools used in classrooms, in child care centers, and in homes across the world.  They are used to promote good behaviors and reward children for those behaviors, which is why they are also known as behavior charts.  They can be used in a variety of situations and they can come in a variety of styles.  Progress charts are easy to use and promote positive reinforcement.

What is it?
A progress chart is a reward system.  It involves stickers or stars, and a chart that can be either printed off or made by hand.  The main goal of a progress chart is to track children's learning or behavior.  It can be used to curb bad behaviors and to encourage good behaviors. It is inexpensive and can be changed to fit different situations. The child earns stickers for the desired behavior and after so many stars, earns a reward.

Variety
The Raising Children Network agrees that you can either make a chart or you can find them just about anywhere on the internet. Children all have different needs when learning, so these charts can help children of any age with anything from potty training to reading books.  Progress charts can be used at home as well as in daycares and in schools.  These charts can be individualized throughout classrooms, where children can learn to make their own specialized ones.  There are several types of charts that parents, caregivers, and educators can use.

Types

 Chore chart
 Behavior charts
 Single behavior charts
Multiple behavior charts
 Homework charts
 Toilet training charts

Single behavior charts can be used for all ages and is best used for learning one skill at a time. Multiple behavior charts also can be used for a variety of ages and can be used for processes that require several steps. Chore charts and behavior charts can each be used for several different situations.  On the other hand, Homework charts and toilet training charts are used for what their titles suggest.  Experts advise only using one chart at a time though, otherwise children can get confused and so can the adult. Charts like these can be found on several websites which have pages of downloadable charts that you can print off.  They have a big variety of styles for their charts that can be used for different ages.  All of these charts can be manipulated in order to fit each child's needs easily as well.

Benefits
The benefits of progress charts include motivation for a certain task, and clear expectations for that task or skill.  It provides a visual picture of goal setting and helps the child to achieve the goal and be able to receive a reward. It's a solid basis to a skill that children will have to know in the future—setting goals and achieving them.  The charts give children immediate feedback and this usually invokes fewer consequences.

Rewards
Rewards don't have to be very elaborate, but can be simple.  It's best if rewards are given right away as stickers should be given right away, so that the child knows what the reward is for exactly.  The goal of the reward is to keep the child continuing this behavior or skill. Dr. Virginia Shiller, a psychologist and instructor at the Yale Child Study Center and coauthor of the book Rewards for Kids, rewards can help parents teach their children new habits. Shiller says the key is in how the incentives are given; in setting appropriate, realistic goals; and in figuring out a strategy to achieve them.

See also
Chore chart
Positive reinforcement

References

External links
Printable Charts

Behavior modification
Charts